The Epic is the third studio album by American jazz saxophonist Kamasi Washington and his first on a major-label. It was released on May 5, 2015, by the Brainfeeder record label.

Critical reception

Upon its release, The Epic received positive reviews from music critics. At Metacritic, which assigns a normalized rating out of 100 to reviews from critics, the album received an average score of 83, which indicates "universal acclaim", based on 7 reviews. the AllMusic critic Thom Jurek described the album as "21st century jazz as accessible as it is virtuosic -- feel matters to Washington", and further wrote, "Holistic in breadth and deep in vision, it provides a way into this music for many, and challenges the cultural conversation about jazz without compromising or pandering." Russell Warfield of Drowned in Sound described the album as "wonderful stuff" and that the record "deserves a high score by any standards of evaluation".

The Guardian critic, John Fordham, who was positive in his assessment of the album, wrote, "Only a shortage of thematic surprises – given its extravagant length – keeps it from being quite the seismically jazz-changing departure that some admirers are claiming." Seth Colter Walls of Pitchfork awarded the album the "Best New Music" tag, writing, "The Epic actually makes good on its titular promise without bothering to make even a faint-hearted stab in the direction of fulfilling its pre-release hype."

Accolades

Track listing

CD

Personnel
Credits adapted from vinyl liner notes.

Band
 Kamasi Washington – tenor saxophone, band leader, arrangement, production 
 Thundercat – electric bass 
 Miles Mosley – upright bass , electric bass 
 Ronald Bruner, Jr. – drums  
 Tony Austin – drums , engineering 
 Leon Mobley – percussion 
 Cameron Graves – piano , organ 
 Brandon Coleman – keyboards , organ , piano 
 Ryan Porter – trombone 
 Igmar Thomas – trumpet 
 Dwight Trible – lead vocals 
 Patrice Quinn – lead vocals 

Additional musicians
 Robert Miller – drums 
 Shaunte Palmer – trombone 
 Todd Simon – trumpet 
 Brian Rosemeyer – engineering 

Ensemble – 
 Neel Hammond – violin
 Tylana Renga Enomoto – violin
 Paul Cartwright – violin
 Jennifer Simone – violin
 Lucia Micarelli – violin
 Molly Rogers – viola
 Andrea Whitt – viola
 Artyom Manukyan – cello
 Ginger Murphy – cello
 Dawn Norfleet – choir vocals
 Thalma de Freitas – choir vocals
 Maiya Sykes – choir vocals
 Gina Manziello – choir vocals
 Patrice Quinn – choir vocals
 Natasha F. Agrama – choir vocals
 Dwight Trible – choir vocals
 Steven Wayne – choir vocals
 Taylor Graves – choir vocals
 Charles Jones – choir vocals
 Jason Marales – choir vocals
 Dexter Story – choir vocals
 Cameron Graves – choir vocals
 Tracy Carter – choir vocals
Mixing engineer
 Benjamin Tierney

Charts

Weekly charts

Year-end charts

Certifications

References

External links
 

2015 debut albums
Brainfeeder albums
Kamasi Washington albums
Albums recorded at Kingsize Soundlabs